Q43 may refer to:
 Q43 (New York City bus)
 , a landing ship of the Argentine Navy
 Az-Zukhruf, a surah of the Quran